Fiba or FIBA may refer to:
 FIBA, or the International Basketball Federation 
 Federación Internacional de Béisbol Amateur, 1944–1975 name of the International Baseball Federation
 FIBA Group, an international banking group
 Finansbank, a Turkish bank formerly in FIBA Group
 Fibabanka, a Turkish bank in FIBA Group